Orhan Üstündağ (born 1 February 1967) is a retired Turkish football defender.

References

1967 births
Living people
Turkish footballers
Kardemir Karabükspor footballers
Altay S.K. footballers
Manisaspor footballers
Association football defenders
Süper Lig players